Cesare Barbetti (29 September 1930 – 13 September 2006) was an Italian actor and voice actor.

Barbetti began his career as a child actor in films during the Fascist era. He also worked as a voice actor, dubbing foreign-language films for the Italian market.

Biography
Barbetti was born in Palermo in Sicily in 1930. His parents were both actors. He started off his career as a child actor in 1934 making an uncredited appearance in The Three-Cornered Hat. After his career as a child actor ended, Barbetti became a very successful voice actor and dubber. He was the official Italian voice of Robert Redford.

Other actors Barbetti was known for dubbing also included Robert Duvall, Warren Beatty, Steve McQueen, Kevin Kline, Steve Martin, Rutger Hauer and Dick Van Dyke. He was recognized for voicing Ken Hutch in the Italian version of Starsky & Hutch. Despite being well known as a voice actor, he still did continue his career as a film and television actor.

Death
In July 2006, Barbetti was involved in a car crash. This then resulted in him suffering a severe brain injury and he died two months later just 16 days short of his 76th birthday. His final film role was serving as the Italian voice of Doc Hudson in the Pixar film Cars.

Filmography

Cinema
 The Three-Cornered Hat (1934)
 I'll Give a Million (1935)
 Eternal Melodies (1940)
 The Betrothed (1941)
 I Live as I Please (1942)
 The Countess of Castiglione (1942)
 Dagli Appennini alle Ande (1943)
 The White Angel (1943)
 The Legend of Faust (1949)
 The Great Waiver (1951)
 Messalina (1951)
 War and Peace (1956)
 The Assassination of Matteotti (1973)
 Malamore (1982)
 A School Outing (1983)
 Zeder (1983)
 Bank Clerks (1985)
 Graduation Party (1985)
 Ultimo minuto (1987)
 D'Annunzio (1987)
 Everybody's Fine (1990)

Dubbing roles

Animation
Doc Hudson in Cars
John Lennon in Yellow Submarine
Fnog in Futurama
Narrator in The Swan Princess
Torai in Hurricane Polymar
Jeffrey Robbins in Gargoyles

Live action
Jay Gatsby in The Great Gatsby
Sundance Kid in Butch Cassidy and the Sundance Kid
Roy Loomis in War Hunt
Wade Lewis in Inside Daisy Clover
Major Julian Cook in A Bridge Too Far
Henry Brubaker in Brubaker
Jack Weil in Havana
Warren Justice in Up Close and Personal
Hank Wilson in Situation Hopeless... But Not Serious
Owen Legate in This Property Is Condemned
Paul Bratter in Barefoot in the Park
John Dortmunder in The Hot Rock
Hubbell Gardiner in The Way We Were
Johnny Hooker in The Sting
Waldo Pepper in The Great Waldo Pepper
Joseph Turner in Three Days of the Condor
Bob Woodward in All the President's Men
Sonny Steele in The Electric Horseman
Roy Hobbs in The Natural
Denys Finch Hatton in Out of Africa
Tom Logan in Legal Eagles
Martin Bishop / Martin Brice in Sneakers
Old Norman Maclean in A River Runs Through It
John Gage in Indecent Proposal
Tom Booker in The Horse Whisperer
Eugene Irwin in The Last Castle
Nathan D. Muir in Spy Game
Wayne Hayes in The Clearing
Einar Gilkyson in An Unfinished Life
Tom Hagen in The Godfather
Tom Hagen in The Godfather Part II
Norman Shrike in Let's Get Harry
Captain in Thank You for Smoking
Buck Weston in Kicking & Screaming
Tom Spellacy in True Confessions
Harry Hogge in Days of Thunder
Al Sieber in Geronimo: An American Legend
Bernie White in The Paper
Wyly King in Something to Talk About
Spurgeon "Fish" Tanner in Deep Impact
Griffin Weir in The 6th Day
Frank Grimes in John Q.
John J. Anderson in Assassination Tango
Dick Tracy in Dick Tracy
Berry-Berry Willart in All Fall Down
Joe Grady in The Only Game in Town
Lyle Rogers in Ishtar
Bugsy Siegel in Bugsy
Mike Gambril in Love Affair
Jay Billington Bulworth in Bulworth
Fidel in Somebody Up There Likes Me
Eric "The Kid" Stoner in The Cincinnati Kid
Carter 'Doc' McCoy in The Getaway
Bill Ringa in Never So Few
Eustis Clay in Soldier in the Rain
Max Sand in Nevada Smith
Jake Holman in The Sand Pebbles
Boon Hogganbeck in The Reivers
Michael Delaney in Le Mans
Henri Charrière in Papillon
Thomas Stockmann in An Enemy of the People
James T. Kirk in Star Trek IV: The Voyage Home
James T. Kirk in Star Trek V: The Final Frontier
James T. Kirk in Star Trek Generations
Harrison Byers in Judgment at Nuremberg
Aidan Carvell in Land of the Free
Denny Crane in Boston Legal (seasons 1-2)
Ken Hutch in Starsky & Hutch
Jefferson Cope in Appointment with Death
Joshua Bolt in Here Come the Brides
Original Hutch in Starsky & Hutch
Caractacus Potts in Chitty Chitty Bang Bang
Edgar Hopper in What a Way to Go!
Jack Albany in Never a Dull Moment
Roger Cobb in All of Me
C.D. Bales in Roxanne
Freddy Benson in Dirty Rotten Scoundrels
Newton Davis in Housesitter
Jonas Nightengale in Leap of Faith
Philip in Mixed Nuts
Frank Sangster in Novocaine
Steve Martin in Jiminy Glick in Lalawood
Farnsworth "Dex" Dexter in Dynasty
Walter Donovan in Indiana Jones and the Last Crusade
Sir Leigh Teabing in The Da Vinci Code
Raoul in Who Framed Roger Rabbit
John Hammond in Jurassic Park 
John Hammond in The Lost World: Jurassic Park
Otto West in A Fish Called Wanda
Paden in Silverado
Donald Woods in Cry Freedom
Nick Starkey in The January Man
Joey Boca in I Love You to Death
Jeffrey Anderson in Soapdish
Rod McCain / Vince McCain in Fierce Creatures
Howard Brackett in In & Out
Artemus Gordon / Ulysses S. Grant in Wild Wild West
John Ryder in The Hitcher
Nick Parker in Blind Fury
Sallow in The Blood of Heroes
Harley Stone in Split Second
Omega Doom in Omega Doom
Swan in Phantom of the Paradise
Henry Hill in Goodfellas
Paul "Bear" Briant in Forrest Gump
William Vaughn in Michael Hayes
Steve Walker in Blackbeard's Ghost
Mark Garrison in The Ugly Dachshund
Jim Douglas in The Love Bug
Jim Douglas in Herbie Goes to Monte Carlo
Albert Dooley in The Million Dollar Duck
Wilby Daniels in The Shaggy D.A.
Johnny Baxter in Snowball Express
Zeke Kelso in That Darn Cat!
Jake Rogers in The Chase
Old James Ryan in Saving Private Ryan
Art Silver in For the Boys
Steven Kovacs' father in The Cable Guy
Robert Ross in Who Is Killing the Great Chefs of Europe?
Don Diego de la Vega in Zorro
Michael Scott in That Lucky Touch
Sebastian Oldsmith in Shout at the Devil
Shawn Fynn in The Wild Geese
Gavin Stewart in The Sea Wolves
Lord Edgar Dobbs in The Quest
Brett Sinclair in The Persuaders!
Jim Phelps in Mission: Impossible
Paul Serone in Anaconda
Nate in Heat
Blind Indian in U Turn
Larry Zoolander in Zoolander
Frederick Treves in The Elephant Man
Adam Evans in A Change of Seasons
William Bligh in The Bounty
Abraham Van Helsing in Bram Stoker's Dracula
J. J. "Jake" Gittes in Chinatown
John Colby in Escape to Victory

References

Bibliography 
 Callisto Cosulich. I film di Alberto Lattuada. Gremese Editore, 1985.

External links 

 
 

1930 births
2006 deaths
Male actors from Palermo
Italian male film actors
Italian male voice actors
Italian male television actors
Italian male child actors
Italian voice directors
20th-century Italian male actors
21st-century Italian male actors
Road incident deaths in Italy